Sky Eats Airplane was an American post-hardcore band from Fort Worth, Texas. The band was signed to indie label Equal Vision Records and most recently released their self-titled full-length album through the label in July 2008. In March 2012, the official Sky Eats Airplane Facebook fan page indicated that there would be new SEA music sometime that year, although in November it was revealed that the band appears to be in an indefinite hiatus.

History

Formation (2005) 
Sky Eats Airplane was formed originally by Arlington Heights High School students Brack Cantrell and Lee Duck of the band Our First Fall. The two left their previous band and began writing heavier music while experimenting with synthetic beats in the background, quickly gaining a following.

Everything Perfect on the Wrong Day and departure of Brack Cantrell (2005–2006) 
After working on some demos, the band received attention on Myspace. They began working on their debut album Everything Perfect on the Wrong Day in early 2006 using Propellerhead Reason, Adobe Audition and a guitar. Over a three-month span they self-produced the nine-track album. Sky Eats Airplane held their CD release party for their debut album at The Door in Dallas, Texas, drawing 125 people. In late 2006, Brack left the band to concentrate on his solo work and finish high school.

New line-up, Sky Eats Airplane, touring, and departure of Kenny Schick and Jerry Roush (2006–2009) 

Lee Duck asked Zack Ordway, Kenny Schick, and Johno Erickson of local metalcore outfit (In Theory) to join Sky Eats Airplane. This led to auditioning singers via Myspace. After lengthy tryouts, they decided upon Jerry Roush from Hampton, Virginia. Roush had previously played drums in hardcore bands, and this was his first attempt as being a front man. He was sent instrumental versions of tracks "Giants In The Ocean" and "Long Walks On Short Bridges" to record his vocals over for his audition. Since the new formation of Sky Eats Airplane, they were signed to a distribution agreement with Thriving Records where they re-released Everything Perfect on The Wrong Day on November 20, 2007 and since signed with Equal Vision Records.

During early 2008 the band entered Salad Days Studios in Baltimore with producer Brian McTernan (Circa Survive, Thrice, The Bled, Senses Fail), to record their self-titled follow up album. The album was released on July 22, 2008, through Equal Vision Records.

Throughout the end of 2008, and the first six months of 2009, they were touring constantly across the country, also participating in "Warped Tour 2008".

On January 11, 2009, Kenny Schick left the group to focus on matters involving his family. He was replaced by Travis Orbin (formerly part of the band Periphery).

During July 2009, Sky Eats Airplane released a statement saying that they had parted ways with their vocalist, Jerry Roush, citing creative differences.

Two new members, The Sound of Symmetry, and departure of Johno Erickson and Bryan Zimmerman (2009–2010) 
In December 2009, Sky Eats Airplane released a blog saying; After going through over 1000 messages, they have found not one but two new members: Bryan Zimmerman and Elliot Coleman. This blog was also met with negative reaction as they announced that Johno would definitely be leaving the band, to be replaced by Coleman. They played their first show with new vocalist Bryan Zimmerman and new bassist at The Pulse in Berlin, Maryland with Equal Vision label mates Life On Repeat. The band released an EP entitled The Sound of Symmetry in April 2010, with Taylor Larson of Oceanic Recording in Bethesda, MD, and have several tour dates lined up, and toured all throughout 2010.
A couple days after announcing that they had planned on releasing new material, but were planning on taking a short break; new vocalist "Bryan Zimmerman" announced his departure for unknown reasons.

Hiatus and other projects (2010–present)
In December 2010, Luis Dubuc of The Secret Handshake stated that Zack Ordway, Elliot Coleman, and Travis Orbin were members of Luis' metal band Of Legends, and were confirmed for a U.S. tour spring of 2011.[13] Elliot Coleman was involved in three projects at the time: Of Man Not Of Machine (featuring Misha Mansoor of Periphery), Zelliack (a soul/R 'n' B/jazz side project with Zack Ordway) and the progressive metal group Tesseract, but departed from Tesseract in June 2012. Zack Ordway and Travis Orbin are members of an "Alien Metal" project called Killtrox and the Motherships.
When asked if Sky Eats Airplane had broken up, Coleman stated "not officially, but it's certainly not a priority for any of us. We're all in different bands now." "We will be taking a little hiatus".

On November 7, 2012, Lee Duck updated Sky Eats Airplane's Facebook status to inform fans what was going on with the band.

"Hey guys, this is Lee Duck. A lot of you are curious about the current state of the band. There has been a few attempts for us to get some new music together, but for various different reasons, we have not be able to bring it into fruition recently. I am not saying never, but right now, I am wrapped up with my lighting company Duck Lights, and Zack & Elliot are doing Zelliack. There has also been the discussion on who would even sing if we were to put out music again, which hurt a bit of our momentum. I apologize for having you guys in the dark for so long."

Members

Final lineup
 Bryan Zimmerman – lead vocals (2009–2011)
 Zack Ordway – lead guitar, keyboards, programming (2006–2011)
 Lee Duck – rhythm guitar (2006–2011), keyboards, synthesizers, programming, piano, percussion, strings, backing vocals (2005–2011); lead guitar, bass, drums (2005–2006)
 Elliot Coleman – bass, backing vocals (2009–2011)
 Travis Orbin – drums, percussion (2009–2011)

Former members
 Brack Cantrell – lead vocals, rhythm guitar, keyboards, synthesizers, programming, piano, bass, drums, percussion (2005–2006)
 Johno Erickson – bass (2006–2009)
 Kenny Schick – drums, percussion (2006–2009)
 Jerry Roush – lead vocals (2006–2009)

Timeline

Discography

Studio albums

Extended plays

Music videos

References

External links 
 

Metalcore musical groups from Texas
Nintendocore musical groups
Electronicore musical groups
Electronic music groups from Texas
American post-hardcore musical groups
Musical groups established in 2005
Musical groups disestablished in 2011
Equal Vision Records artists
Tragic Hero Records artists